Rahul Bhat was a Kashmiri Pandit and resident of Budgam, Jammu and Kashmir, India, who was murdered by terrorists belonging to Lashkar-e-Taiba.

See also 

 Exodus of Kashmiri Hindus

References 

Crime in Jammu and Kashmir